Tao Rancheng (born 1 June 1970) is a Chinese football referee. He has refereed internationally in the AFC Asian Cup, ASEAN Football Championship, and FIFA World Cup qualifiers. He is also a referee at the Chinese Super League.

References

1970 births
Chinese football referees
Living people